Mark Shim (born  November 21, 1973 in Kingston, Jamaica) is a jazz tenor saxophonist.

History

Shim's family moved from Kingston to Canada when he was eight years old, and then settled in Richmond, Virginia five years later. He started on sax in seventh grade, graduating from high school in 1991 and attending Virginia Commonwealth University and William Paterson College. In 1994 he moved to Brooklyn, where he played and recorded with Hamiett Bluiett in Harlem. He then played with Elvin Jones, Mose Allison, Betty Carter, Greg Osby, and the Mingus Big Band. Shim's debut record for Blue Note appeared in 1998, with two more following on the label in 2000.

Discography
Mind over Matter (Blue Note, 1998)
New Directions with Stefon Harris, Jason Moran, Greg Osby (Blue Note, 2000)
Turbulent Flow (Blue Note, 2000)
Far from Over with Vijay Iyer (ECM, 2017)
Travail, Transformation, and Flow with the Steve Lehman Octet (Pi Recordings, 2009)
Mise en Abîme with the Steve Lehman Octet (Pi Recordings, 2014)

References
Leonard Feather and Ira Gitler, The Biographical Encyclopedia of Jazz. Oxford, 1999, p. 600.

Jamaican jazz saxophonists
Male saxophonists
Living people
1973 births
21st-century saxophonists
21st-century male musicians
Male jazz musicians